Reza Dehghani (Persian: رضا دهقانی, (born 7 January 1998) is an Iranian professional footballer who plays as a winger for Naft Masjed Soleyman in the Persian Gulf Pro League.

He made his Iran Pro League debut on 20 November 2017 against Persepolis.

Club career statistics 

Last Update:21 November 2017

References

External links 

 
Reza Dehghani at Soccerway

Sepahan S.C. footballers
1998 births
Living people
Iranian footballers
Iran youth international footballers
Association football midfielders
Sportspeople from Isfahan
Nassaji Mazandaran players